Charles Reed Norris (April 15, 1925 – July 20, 2009) was an American politician, businessman, and military officer who served as a member of the Oregon House of Representatives.

Early life
Norris was born in Pasadena, California and was raised in Americus, Kansas, where he attended high school. He served in the United States Army from 1943 to 1971. At the time of his retirement as a colonel, Norris was Commander of the Umatilla Army Depot in Hermiston, Oregon.

Career 
Upon his retirement from the military, Norris worked as a realtor and business executive. He served in the Oregon House of Representatives for the 57th District as a Republican from 1987 to 1997, residing in Hermiston. During his tenure, Norris played a role in securing funding for the Oregon National Guard Armory. In the House, he also served as a member of the Water Policy Committee.

Personal life 
He was married to Betty Lou Norris and had four children. In 2002, Norris and his wife retired and moved from Hermiston to Royal Palm Beach, Florida. He died in 2009 in West Palm Beach, Florida. He is a member of the Oregon State University College of Agriculture Sciences Hall of Fame.

References

1925 births
2009 deaths
People from Americus, Kansas
People from Pasadena, California
People from Hermiston, Oregon
Republican Party members of the Oregon House of Representatives
United States Army colonels
20th-century American politicians
People from Palm Beach County, Florida
Military personnel from California
Military personnel from Oregon